Mar Yar Hlae Kwat is a 2020 Burmese drama television series. It aired on MRTV-4, from October 5 to November 13, 2020, on Mondays to Fridays at 19:00 for 30 episodes.

Cast
Min Phone Myat as Htoo Myat Paing
Poe Kyar Phyu Khin as Annawar Mone
Aung Paing as Nay Thar
Khant as Amara
Thuta Aung as Win Naing
Kaung Htet Thar as Lin Sett Yan
Su Lin Shein as Yati Paing (who is the killer of Myanmar Civilian's niece)
Min Thu as U Moe Nyo
Mya Hnin Yee Lwin as Daw Honey Cho
May Kabyar as Daw Thet Thet Mar
Min Oo as U Myat Paing
Hla Myo Thinzar Nwe as Daw Tin Ma Ma

References

Burmese television series
MRTV (TV network) original programming